Ernest Benbow (14 March 1888 – 28 December 1940) was an Australian cricketer. He played in two first-class matches for Queensland in 1909/10.

See also
 List of Queensland first-class cricketers

References

External links
 

1888 births
1940 deaths
Australian cricketers
Queensland cricketers
Cricketers from Queensland